Meta (also unofficially known as Meta di Sorrento) is a  (municipality) in the Metropolitan City of Naples  in the Italian region Campania, located about 25 km southeast of Naples.  

Meta borders the municipalities of Piano di Sorrento and Vico Equense.

See also
Sorrentine Peninsula
Amalfi Coast

References

External links

 Meta di Sorrento Interactive Map
 Comune di Meta Official Website

Cities and towns in Campania